Leonid Grigoryevich Ivanov (25 July 1921 in Petrograd – 14 September 1990 in Leningrad) was a Soviet football player.

Honours
 Soviet Cup winner: 1944.

International career
Ivanov made his debut for USSR on 15 July 1952 in an Olympics game against Bulgaria. He allowed 5 goals in his next game against Yugoslavia (5:5), 3 more in a replay against Yugoslavia and never played for the national team again.

References

External links
  Profile

1921 births
1990 deaths
Russian footballers
Soviet footballers
Soviet Union international footballers
FC Zenit Saint Petersburg players
FC Shakhtar Donetsk players
Olympic footballers of the Soviet Union
Footballers at the 1952 Summer Olympics
Association football goalkeepers